Rock
is a coastal fishing village in Cornwall, England, United Kingdom. It is opposite Padstow on the north-east bank of the River Camel estuary. The village is in the civil parish of St Minver Lowlands 

Toponymy
An alternative, Blaketorre ('Black Tor'), is found in 1337. This had become Black Rock by the 18th century and was subsequently shortened to Rock. The name of the ferry that operates between Rock and Padstow recalls the old place name.

Geography
The main residential area is set back from the coast along the road from Pityme and St Minver. To the northeast, Rock is contiguous with the settlements of Splatt and Pityme. Stoptide is a southern extension of Rock. Rock is best known for its estuary frontage. To the northwest, the road runs beside the estuary as a cul de sac giving access to the ferry boarding point and an intertidal beach backed by sand dunes which at low water extend for two miles past Brea Hill to Daymer Bay. To the south is the small coastal settlement of Porthilly with St Michael's Church situated on the bank of Porthilly Cove.

Rock Dunes
Rock Dunes, sand dunes to the west of the village on the banks of the River Camel, are designated a Site of Special Scientific Interest for their flora and geology. These include various vegetation found in these embryo dunes as well as various types of slate.

Tourism
Rock is popular with holidaymakers and in 1881 the hotel was enlarged, a new sea-wall built and a bathing house erected on the beach. In the same year Silvanus Trevail designed and built two large villas. It is now a well-established centre for water sports including dinghy racing, waterskiing, windsurfing, and sailing. Rock Sailing Club's headquarters, in a converted warehouse on a wharf, is a local landmark. Rock has Cornwall's highest proportion of second homes in the county.

The Black Tor Ferry operates across the river to the town of Padstow, and this is a major source of tourist traffic through Rock. The early 21st century has seen extensive building work and increased prosperity for Rock, there a large number of holiday homes, as well as a number of retail outlets. Rock is also home to Sharp's Brewery, a real ale brewery established as an independent in the mid 1990s, but taken over by Molson Coors in 2011 to secure the Doom Bar bitter brand.

Rock has been referred to as 'Britain's Saint-Tropez' and the 'Kensington of Cornwall' due to its popularity with affluent holidaymakers. The Daily Telegraph has also called it Chelsea-on-Sea and stated that David Cameron's favourite beer is brewed there.

Affluent visitors such as Mohamed Al-Fayed and Jay Kay of Jamiroquai often arrive by helicopter.

References

External links

 
 Rock Tourist Information available from Padstow TIC

Beaches of Cornwall
Fishing communities
Populated coastal places in Cornwall
Sites of Special Scientific Interest in Cornwall
Villages in Cornwall